Lady Shore was a barque-rigged merchantman, launched in 1793 at Hull, England. She made two voyages as an "extra ship" (i.e., under charter) for the British East India Company (EIC), though capture by a French privateer cut short the second. She then returned to mercantile service, sailing primarily to the West Indies. She was wrecked near the Saint Lawrence River in 1815.

Voyages to Bengal
Lady Shores first voyage was as an "extra ship" in the services of the East India Company. Under Captain John Christopher she sailed under a letter of marque dated 3 June 1794. She sailed from Plymouth on 22 June 1794, bound for Bengal. She reached the Cape of Good Hope on 25 September, and Calcutta on 17 January 1795. On her return leg she was at Diamond Harbour on 16 March, Saint Helena on 1 June, the River Shannon on 13 September, and The Downs on 13 October.

Her second voyage was more eventful. Captain Christopher sailed for Bengal again in 1796, but on 19 July the French corvette Moineau captured her off the Cape of Good Hope. Moineau was armed with twenty-six 9-pounder guns and had a crew of 190 men under the command of Commander Tayeau. He was sailing from Mauritius to Bordeaux when he encountered Lady Shore. The French took only a few prisoners, looted her stores and cargo, and then allowed her to proceed to the Cape.

The French released Lady Shore in Simon's Bay on 22 July. She left the Cape on  2 September and St Helena on 20 September. She reached The Downs in November.

Subsequent career
Lady Shore, of 316 tons (bm), launched in Hull in 1793, appears in Lloyd's Register in 1799. In March 1803, Lloyd's List reported that Lady Shore had left Gibraltar on 11 February in a convoy under the escort of HMS Halcyon.

Lloyd's List reported that the "Lady Shore Transport" had run aground at Margate on the morning of 29 November 1814, but that she had been gotten off the next day with only the loss of an anchor. Some boats then brought her into Westgate Bay.

Fate
In July 1815, Lloyd's List reported that the transports Lady Shore, Watson, master, Fame, Shaw, master, Adamant, and Robert and Mary had all been lost near the Saint Lawrence River while sailing to Quebec.

Notes, citations, and references
Notes

Citations

References
 

1793 ships
Ships built on the Humber
Ships of the British East India Company
Captured ships
Age of Sail merchant ships
Merchant ships of the United Kingdom
Maritime incidents in 1815